The 2023 Copa do Brasil second round was the second round of the 2023 Copa do Brasil football competition. It was played from 7 to 16 March 2023. A total of 40 teams competed in the second round to decide 20 places in the third round of the 2023 Copa do Brasil.

Format
In the second round, each tie was played on a single-legged basis. If the score was level, the match would go straight to the penalty shoot-out to determine the winners. Host teams were settled in the first-round draw.

Matches
All times are Brasília time, BRT (UTC−3)

|}

Match 41

Match 42

Match 43

Match 44

Match 45

Match 46

Match 47

Match 48

Match 49

Match 50

Match 51

Match 52

Match 53

Match 54

Match 55

Match 56

Match 57

Match 58

Match 59

Match 60

References

2023 in Brazilian football